"Cowboy Man" is a song written and recorded by American singer-songwriter Lyle Lovett. It was released in October 1986 as the second single from his album Lyle Lovett. The song peaked at number 10 on the Billboard Hot Country Singles chart.

Content
The song is in the key of B-flat major, mainly following the chord pattern B-E-B-F7-B. Written by Lovett himself, it was one of four songs included on a demo tape that he submitted to ASCAP's Merlin Littlefield. Described by The Orlando Sentinel writer Thom Duffy as "a bit of Texas swing that features a shuffling beat and a fiddle crying like the horn of a passing freight train", the song is about the narrator's pursuit of a cowgirl whom he wants to marry.

Chart performance

References

Songs about cowboys and cowgirls
1986 singles
Lyle Lovett songs
Curb Records singles
Song recordings produced by Tony Brown (record producer)
Songs written by Lyle Lovett
1986 songs